Shanti Snyder (born 4 June 1981), better known as Shanti, is a Japanese lyricist, singer, songwriter, and music TV host of mixed descent, based in Japan and hailing from Kanagawa Prefecture. She performs with a few different formations at clubs in the Tokyo area and has also appeared with various other musical artists. Shanti's voice is well known through her collaborations with Yoko Kanno, notably in Escaflowne the Movie, where she was the vocalist on the theme song "Sora".

Biography
Shanti is a frequent lyricist and vocalist for commercials, working with many Tokyo based commercial song production companies and advertising agencies, recording songs and narrations for businesses such as Coca-Cola, Tokyo Disney Resort, and Xerox. Shanti Snyder wrote four songs on J-pop singer Crystal Kay's debut album, C.L.L Crystal Lover Light.

In 2008, the song called "Home" that Shanti co-wrote with Hajime Yoshizawa featured her voice. It received attention in Japan when it was used for a caffe latte advertising campaign featuring Scarlett Johansson. In June 2008, when the song was pre-released on iTunes to promote Hajime Yoshizawa's Japan album, it was number 1 on iTunes for a short time.

Shanti's debut album, Share My Air, was recorded in Paris with some of France's top musicians. The album was released in Japan on the Hayama label.

From October 2008 until March 2010, Shanti was the co-host for J-Melo, an NHK World music program that was broadcast worldwide.

Shanti sang the ending theme song, "Pray for the World", for the film Reunion released in Japan in February 2013."

Discography

Albums 
Source:
 Share My Air, 18 January 2008
 Born to Sing, 23 June 2010
 Romance with Me, 26 January 2011
 Lotus Flower, 22 February 2012
 Cloud 9, 5 December 2012
 "Jazz en Rose", 6 March 2013

Singles 
Source:
 "The Christmas Song", 2010
 "Lovin' You", 2012

References

External links 

 
 
 Nippon Columbia profile 
 NHK's J-Melo site

Japanese people of American descent
Japanese women singer-songwriters
Japanese singer-songwriters
Living people
Musicians from Kanagawa Prefecture
1981 births
21st-century Japanese singers
21st-century Japanese women singers